The 2022  Vitality Blast was the 2022 season of the T20 Blast, a professional Twenty20 cricket league played in England and Wales. The tournament was held from 25 May to 16 July 2022. It was the fifth season in which the domestic T20 competition, run by the England and Wales Cricket Board (ECB), was branded as the Vitality Blast due to the tournament's sponsorship reason. The Kent Spitfires were the defending champions, having won their second title during previous season. On 20 January 2022, the ECB announced the fixtures for the tournament.

On 17 June 2022, in the North Group match between the Birmingham Bears and the Notts Outlaws, the Birmingham Bears set a new record for the highest total in an English T20 match, with 261/2. Four days later, Surrey became the first team to qualify for the quarter-finals, with their ninth win out of ten games. Following the conclusion of matches played on 1 July 2022, Somerset, the Essex Eagles, and the Hampshire Hawks from the South Group had all confirmed their places in the quarter-finals. The Birmingham Bears also qualified, after winning the North Group. The Derbyshire Falcons and the Lancashire Lightning also qualified from the North Group, with the Yorkshire Vikings taking the final place in the quarter-finals.

The Yorkshire Vikings, the Hampshire Hawks, Lancashire Lightning and Somerset all won their quarter-final matches to secure their places at Finals Day. In Somerset's match, against the Derbyshire Falcons, Somerset set a new record for the highest team total in an English T20 match, with 265/5, breaking the record set earlier in the tournament by the Birmingham Bears. In the final, the Hampshire Hawks beat Lancashire Lightning by one run to win their third title.

Format
Playing format were similar to the previous season, where groups remain the same with the familiar North and South split, while each county will play 14 group-stage matches, seven at home and seven away.

Teams
The teams were divided into the following groups:

 North Group: Birmingham Bears, Derbyshire Falcons, Durham, Lancashire Lightning, Leicestershire Foxes, Northants Steelbacks, Notts Outlaws, Worcestershire Rapids, Yorkshire Vikings

 South Group: Essex Eagles, Glamorgan, Gloucestershire, Hampshire Hawks, Kent Spitfires, Middlesex, Somerset, Surrey, Sussex Sharks

North Group

South Group

Standings

North Group

 Advanced to the quarter-finals

South Group

 Advanced to the quarter-finals

Knock-out stage
The ECB confirmed the following fixtures for the knock-out stage of the tournament.

Quarter-finals

Finals Day

Semi-finals

Final

Finals Day clubs' stadiums

References

External links
 Series home at ESPN Cricinfo

2022 in English cricket